Gino Banks is an Indian drummer and member of the fusion band 'Nexus'. He is son of popular Jazz musician Louis Banks. Gino Banks performed with santoor player Tarun Bhattacharya, on Indian Independence Day's eve, at Ravindra Bharathi auditorium, in 2016. He also performed at the Four Aces concert in 2022, alongside other Indian and Fusion legends, including Shankar Mahadevan, Zakir Hussain (musician), Louis Banks (his father), Sheldon D'Silva, Rakesh Chaurasia and as a guest star Vandana Somaia.

Background 
Gino Banks learnt to play drums from his father Louis Banks, and usually accompanies his father, while performing on stage.

References

Living people
Indian male musicians
Musicians from Mumbai
Indian drummers
Jazz drummers
Male jazz musicians
Year of birth missing (living people)